Suryaa: An Awakening (Hindi: सूर्या: एक जागृति, pronounced Soorya: Ek Jaagrti) is a 1989 action film directed by Esmayeel Shroff. The film stars Raaj Kumar, Vinod Khanna, Bhanupriya, Raj Babbar in lead roles. It was a financial success.

Plot
In the small community of Sargaon (Shikarpur) in rural India, Pt. Gangadhar Choudhary rules with an iron fist, forbidding anyone from speaking out against him. He owns most of the land surrounding his palatial home, save for a small patch of land owned by Veer Singh.

One day, he summons Veer to his house and offers to buy his land for a substantial sum of money, but Veer refuses. Pt. Gangadhar has him killed. Veer's wife then dies of shock, leaving behind their son, Suraj, to be brought up by a kindly widow called Mrs. Salma Khan.

Many years later, following a successful military career, Suraj returns to his home village to avenge his parents' death. The real name of Pt. Gangadhar Chaudhary son's name Ramniwas and Jaibhagwan.

Cast

 Raaj Kumar as Collector Rajpal Chauhan 
 Vinod Khanna as Suraj Singh "Suryaa"
 Bhanupriya as Shanno
 Raj Babbar as Inspector Iqbal Khan 
 Shakti Kapoor as Ratan Chaudhary 
 Amrish Puri as Gangadhar Chaudhary
 Sushma Seth as Salma Khan 
 Aloknath as Veer Singh
 Sudhir Dalvi as Army Senior Officer 
 Johnny Lever as Jani
 Salim Ghouse as Ramu Gulzar
 Dulari as Ramu's Mother
 Dinesh Hingoo as Bank Manager
 Rajesh Puri as Gangadhar's Munim
Smita Talwalkar as Gangadhar Chaudhary's Wife (Guest Role)

Music

References

External links 
 

1980s Hindi-language films
1989 films
Films scored by Laxmikant–Pyarelal